The ARCA Menards Series is an American stock car series, the premier division of the Automobile Racing Club of America (ARCA). It is considered a minor, semi-professional league of stock car racing, used as a feeder series into the three national touring series of NASCAR, and hosts events at a variety of track types including superspeedways, road courses, and dirt tracks. It also provides hobby drivers a chance to experience racing at large tracks used in the three national touring series in NASCAR. The series has had a longstanding relationship with NASCAR, including using former NASCAR Cup Series cars, hosting events in the same race weekend such as Daytona Speedweeks, and naming an award after NASCAR founder Bill France, Sr. However, the series was not officially affiliated with NASCAR until its buyout on April 27, 2018.

The series was known as the ARCA Permatex SuperCar Series from 1986 until 1991, the ARCA Hooters SuperCar Series from 1993 until 1995, and as the ARCA Bondo/Mar-Hyde Series from 1996 to 2000. The series was sponsored by real estate company RE/MAX as the ARCA RE/MAX Series from 2001 until 2009. Midwest-based home improvement company Menards began sponsoring the series in 2010 jointly with RE/MAX, and became the lone presenting sponsor in 2011, and from then until February 2019 the series was known as the ARCA Racing Series presented by Menards.

History

The series was founded in Toledo, Ohio in 1953 as the Midwest Association for Race Cars (MARC), a local touring group in the Midwestern United States. The series was founded by John Marcum, a friend and former competitor of Bill France, Sr. and former NASCAR employee, who created MARC as a northern counterpart to the southern-based NASCAR. Early drivers included Iggy Katona and Nelson Stacy.

The series became a part of Daytona Speedweeks in 1964 at the request of Bill France, allowing the series to open its season alongside the Daytona 500. The same year, the series name was changed from MARC (Midwest Association for Race Cars) to the current ARCA (Automobile Racing Club of America) as a suggestion from France to give the series more national exposure.

The series races on a variety of tracks from small ovals to superspeedways such as Daytona International Speedway. In 2008 the series returned to racing on a road course. The series is currently headed by Marcum's grandson, Ron Drager.

Due to the similarity between the cars and racetracks of the two series, the ARCA Racing Series is frequently used to develop young drivers looking to break into the top three series of NASCAR. The series has spawned such drivers as Benny Parsons, Ken Schrader and Kyle Petty, and helped more recent NASCAR Cup Series drivers Kyle Busch, Justin Allgaier, Casey Mears, and Sam Hornish Jr. get acclimated to stock cars. Young drivers will often race in the series opener at Daytona International Speedway to gain NASCAR approval to run at superspeedways in the Truck or Xfinity Series. Other drivers, such as 10-time champion Frank Kimmel and 9-time race winner Bobby Gerhart remain in the series as opposed to pursuing a full-time career in NASCAR. NASCAR regulars, notably Ken Schrader, are known to frequent the series as well. Other notable drivers, such as Benny Chastain, and Andy Jankowiak, race in the series as a hobby.

Drivers as young as 17 may be approved to drive on speedway tracks, and drivers as young as 15 years can be permitted to drive at courses less than one mile in length and road courses. This is one year younger than the minimum age of 16 in the Camping World Truck Series (also for short tracks and road courses only). Drivers must be 18 to race in either of the two superspeedway events the series hosts at Daytona and Talladega. 

An Indiana-based indie game developer created ARCA Sim Racing '08 to simulate the RE/MAX championship.

From 1995 until 2016, the Hoosier Racing Tire company was the series tire supplier, with the tires being branded in 2016 by their business partner Continental AG's General Tire.  Continental acquired Hoosier in October 2016.

On April 27, 2018, it was announced that the National Association of Stock Car Auto Racing (NASCAR) had bought out the Automobile Racing Club of America (ARCA), though 2018 and 2019 seasons continued as planned. The ARCA Menards Series plans to retain its name for the 2020 season, while the NASCAR K&N Pro Series East and West will rebrand as the ARCA Menards Series East and West, respectively. On October 2, 2019, NASCAR and ARCA announced the creation of a ten-race short track and road course slate called the ARCA Racing Series Showdown, with drivers from all three series eligible to compete.

In January 2019, ARCA announced that every race for the 2019 season would be broadcast live on television. Eight races were broadcast between FS1 and FS2, while the remaining 12 races ran on MAVTV. This was the first time in series history that every race in a season was broadcast live. Starting in 2023, all races will be broadcast on FS1 or FS2.

ARCA Menards Series cars

The series is known for using veteran steel-bodied Generation 4 cars from the NASCAR Cup Series, running cars until they are several years old and even after a model's discontinuation in the Cup Series. For example, Bobby Gerhart's winning Daytona car in 1999 used a chassis built by Hendrick Motorsports in 1989. Following the transition of the Cup and Xfinity Series to the Car of Tomorrow in 2007 and 2010 respectively, the ARCA Series continued to use the 2007-style models of the Chevrolet Monte Carlo SS (re-branded as the Impala), Ford Fusion, Toyota Camry, and Dodge Charger. The carbureted V8 engines used by the series are also built under similar specifications to their NASCAR counterparts, and occasionally purchased from NASCAR teams. In spite of the similarities, ARCA racing is much more affordable than its more popular counterpart, with car owner Larry Clement estimating the required budget to run an ARCA car as "10 percent of what a NASCAR Cup Series budget is."

ARCA Ilmor 396 engine
On August 1, 2014, ARCA president Ron Drager announced a new engine package option for the 2015 season, in addition to the current open motor rules package. The package is called the ARCA Ilmor 396 engine, alternately known as the ARCA Control Engine (ACE).

The new engine has generated controversy, with some teams that use the former engine package believing that their motors will become obsolete and converting to the new package will be too costly. Teams and outside engine builders also cannot perform maintenance on the engines, and minimal tuning is allowed (including a specification lubricant from Valvoline). The spec engine also reduces manufacturer identity for teams, with construction based on the Chevrolet engine package and branded as an Ilmor. Non-Ilmor engines, meanwhile, are subject to intake and RPM restrictions to maintain performance limits relative to the new package.

Composite car bodies 

On November 4, 2014, at the SEMA Show in Las Vegas, NASCAR president Mike Helton unveiled a new body style for the K&N Pro Series East and West that would also be eligible for use in ARCA competition, based on the Sprint Cup Series Gen 6 models of the Chevrolet SS (A re-badged Holden), Ford Fusion, and Toyota Camry (no Dodge option was offered due to a lack of factory support). The new body, developed with Five Star Race Car Bodies, is constructed of a composite laminate blend and designed with easily replaceable body panels, to reduce the costs of fabrication, and to eliminate on-track debris after accidents. The composite body is also significantly lighter than traditional steel bodies. The composite body debuted at preseason testing at Daytona, with the intent of approving it for tracks over a mile in length.

The composite body debuted at 2015 preseason testing at Daytona, with the intent of approving it for tracks over a mile in length. The body style was made eligible in the 2015 ARCA season only on tracks one mile or shorter in length, with the traditional steel bodies running alongside. The composite bodies made their superspeedway debut at Pocono Raceway on June 3, 2016. In 2018, ARCA began to phase out the Steel bodies, mandating all composite bodies at Daytona and Talladega. In 2022, the Ford Fusion was replaced by the Ford Mustang, but was not widely adopted by Ford teams until 2023.

Specifications

Engine displacement:   pushrod V8
Transmission:  4-speed manual
Weight:   minimum (steel);  (composite); without driver
Power output:  ~ unrestricted
Fuel:  Sunoco unleaded gasoline
Fuel capacity:   or 
Fuel delivery:
Fuel injection – Ilmor only
Carburetion – All other engines
Compression ratio:  12:1
Aspiration:  Naturally aspirated
Wheelbase:
 – except restrictor plate tracks
 – all tracks
Car body:
Steel (Gen 4) – Fit to templates
Composite (Gen 6) – Unmodified
Rear spoiler: Minimum angle 65 degrees (steel); 70 degrees (composite)
Steering:  Power, recirculating ball

Championship results

Below is the list of all-time ARCA Racing Series champions, along with the Rookie of the Year and Bill France Four Crown award winners.

The Rookie of the Year award – currently sponsored by Scott Paper Company – is given to the rookie that scores most points at the end of the season. Winners have included future NASCAR drivers Benny Parsons, Davey Allison, Jeremy Mayfield, Michael McDowell, and Parker Kligerman.

The Bill France Four Crown award, inaugurated in 1984, is a prize given to the driver with most points at four specific events, combining dirt ovals, short ovals, superspeedways and road courses. The award was known as the Bill France Triple Crown prior to 2009, when the road course component was added to the competition. Future Winston Cup Series star Davey Allison won the first Four Crown. Frank Kimmel is the top Bill France Four Crown winner with seven titles.

Other awards include the Superspeedway Challenge (Owners only), the Short Track Challenge (Drivers only), the Pole Award (most poles), the Marcum Award, the ARCA Motorsports Media Award, the Bob Loga Memorial Scholarship, the Spirit Award, Most Popular Driver Award, Most Improved Driver, and Engine Mechanic of the Year.

 Bold driver indicates he/she has won at least 1 NASCAR Cup Series championship.
 Italicized' driver indicates he/she has won at least 1 NASCAR Xfinity Series championship.

See also
List of ARCA drivers
Allen Crowe 100

References

External links

 
Stock car racing series in the United States